Gallini is a tribe of bird in the subfamily Phasianinae. It includes the bamboo partridges, francolins and junglefowl (including the chicken). Members of this tribe are found in both Asia and tropical Africa. This grouping was supported by a 2021 phylogenetic analysis of Galliformes, and has been accepted by the International Ornithological Congress. The tribe name is accepted by the Howard and Moore Complete Checklist of the Birds of the World.

Species

References 

Bird tribes
Gallini